Ras-related C3 botulinum toxin substrate 3 (Rac3) is a G protein that in humans is encoded by the RAC3 gene. It is an important component of intracellular signalling pathways. Rac3 is a member of the Rac subfamily of the Rho family of small G proteins. Members of this superfamily appear to regulate a diverse array of cellular events, including the control of cell growth, cytoskeletal reorganization, and the activation of protein kinases.

Interactions 

RAC3 has been shown to interact with CIB1 and HNF1A. RAC3 also interacts with Nrf2 proteins. ETAR, ILK, and β-arr1 interact with RAC3 as well.

Location 
RAC3 gene is located in the third sub-band of the fifth band in the second region of the q arm on chromosome 17. There’s many tumor suppressor genes that are located around the RAC3 gene.

Therapeutic Use 
Since the RAC3 gene is over-expressed in carcinoma cells, it can function as a therapeutic target for the treatment of different cancer such as lung adenocarcinoma. To become invasive, epithelial cells have to transform into mesenchymal cells and the transformation is regulated by the RAC3 gene. As a result, if the RAC3 gene is silenced, lung adenocarcinoma cells cannot metastasize. In addition, drugs designed to silence the RAC3 gene lead to the apoptosis of tumor cells, thus preventing the cells from colonizing.

Pathological mutations
Mutations of the RAC3 gene may result in neurodevelopmental disorder with structural brain anomalies and dysmorphic facies, first described in 2018 by White et al.

References

Further reading

External links 
RAC3 Info with links in the Cell Migration Gateway